The delegations as they existed in 1859.

Between the Congress of Vienna (1815) and the capture of Rome (1870), the Papal State was subdivided geographically into 17 apostolic delegations (delegazioni apostoliche) for administrative purposes. These were instituted by Pope Pius VII in a motu proprio of 6 July 1816: "Quando per ammirabile disposizione".

A delegation was known as a legation (legazione) when governed by a cardinal. The four northernmost delegations—Bologna, Ferrara, Forlì and Ravenna, which comprised the region known as the Romagne (plural of Romagna)—were regularly governed by cardinals. Thus, the term "Legations" or Papal Legations (Legazioni pontificie), when used on its own, often refers to the Romagne. In an administrative reform of 1850, Pius IX grouped the delegations into five larger legations. The four original legations were joined into the legation of the Romagne. In 1859, the Kingdom of Sardinia invaded the Papal State and set up a military government, the United Provinces of Central Italy, that included the Romagne. Following a plebiscite, the Romagne were formally annexed to Sardinia in 1860.

Motu proprio of 1816
Between 1798 and 1800, and again between 1809 and 1814, the Papal State was occupied by French troops and the pope was in exile. After the restoration of the Papal State by the Congress of Vienna, Pius VII set about reforming its administration, assisted by Cardinal Secretary of State Ercole Consalvi. The result was the motu prioprio of 6 July 1816 "on the organization of public administration".

The existing 12 provinces were abandoned in favour of 17 delegations, although Rome and its hinterland formed a separate comarca. The new administration was modelled on that introduced by the French.

The new delegations were grouped into three classes. At the head of each delegation was a delegate (delegato) who was appointed by the pope through an act of the secretary of state and who was invariably a prelate. Only in case the prelate was a cardinal did he assume the title of legate (legato), and cardinals could only be appointed to the delegations of the first class. Each delegate or legate was assisted by two assessors appointed by the pope, one for civil law matters and one for penal law matters, and by a locally selected Governmental Congregation (Congregazione governativa ), the composition of which varied according to the class of the delegation:
In those of the first class, there were four members: two selected from the capital city and two from the hinterland.
In those of the second class, there were three members: two from the capital and one from the hinterland.
In those of the third class, there were two members: one from the capital and one from the hinterland.

In each delegation, the administration of justice was devolved on a court of first instance (tribunale di prima istanza) for civil matters and a criminal court (tribunale criminale) for crimes. Some of the delegations were subdivided into districts, each headed by a governor. The arrangement created by the motu proprio of 1816 looked like this:

Reforms

Provinces of 1820
In 1820, the delegations and the comarca of Rome were grouped into 11 provinces (province). The delegations of Camerino, Benevento, Bologna and Ferrara were their own provinces under those names. Rieti was its own province, called Sabina, and Urbino e Pesaro was synonymous with the province called Urbino. Rome was joined with Frosinone to form the province of Marittima e Campagna. Viterbo and Civitavecchia were joined to form the province of Patrimonio; Perugia and Spoleto the province of Umbria; Ancona, Ascoli, Fermo and Macerata the province of the Marche; and Forlì and Ravenna the province of Romagna.

Leo XII (1825) and Gregory XVI (1831–32)
Leo XII, successor of Pius VII, issued a motu proprio on 5 October 1825, which reduced the number of delegations from 17 to 13 by combining Fermo and Ascoli, Macerata and Camerino, Spoleto and Rieti and Viterbo and Civitavecchia.

In an edict issued on 5 July 1831, Leo XII's successor, Gregory XVI, reversed his reform and also created a new delegation based on Orvieto out of the territory of the delegation of Viterbo. He raised the number of delegations to 19 the following year with his motu proprio "Luminose prove" of 1 February 1832. The new delegation, based on Velletri and carved out of that of Frosinone, was granted to the Dean of the College of Cardinals and thus constituted a new legation. Although boundaries would change, subsequent reforms would retain a legate at Velletri.

New legations of Pius IX

In 1848, Pius IX, facing revolution in Rome, promulgated a new constitution for the Papal State. It was not enough to quell the revolution and he fled to take refuge in the Kingdom of Naples. In 1849, a Roman Republic was declared. It was crushed by a French army, and Pius returned to Rome on 12 April 1850.

On 22 November 1850, Pius IX issued an edict grouping the 19 delegations into four new legations and a district (circondario, circle or circumscription) around Rome. Each of the new higher-level legations was entrusted to a cardinal.

Local government

1816–47
Pius VII completely reformed the municipal administration. All municipal laws from before or during the Revolution were repealed and municipal government was made uniform across the Papal State.

Local governments were divided into those of the first class ("di primo ordine"), which were the larger cities, and those of the second ("di secondo"), which were all other comuni (municipalities). Each municipality was governed by a mayor called a governor (governatore) appointed by the pope through the secretary of state. Governors of the first class were appointed by papal brief, while those of the second class merely by letters patent. Governors were not necessarily ecclesiastics, and they had to be neither native to nor resident in their municipalities. They were under the authority of the apostolic delegates. The governors held judicial authority in cases involving less than 100 scudi, in property disputes and in some other cases. They were charged with policing fairs and festivals.

Pius VII introduced into each comune a council (consiglio) with deliberative functions and a magistracy (magistratura) with executive functions. The functions of the magistracy had previously belonged to the higher authorities. The original members of the councils were selected by the delegates, but subsequently new councilors were co-opted. The magistracy was composed of elders (anziani) drawn from the council under the leadership of a gonfaloniere (literally, standard-bearer), who was not required to be a councilor. The gonfalonieri were chosen by the secretary of state, while the elders were chosen by the delegate from a list of names submitted by the council.

The small rural villages of the comuni each had their own syndic (sindaco) or procurator (procuratore) subject to the communal gonfaloniere.

1847–70
On 1 October 1847, Pius IX issued the motu proprio "Sull'organizzazione del Consiglio e Senato di Roma e le sue attribuzioni", which extended to Rome the laws applicable in the other municipalities. Rome thus received a council of 100 men: 96 laymen chosen through the census to represent various professions and 4 clergy chosen by the Cardinal Vicar. The Senator was made gonfaloniere (mayor) and presided over an executive body (the magistracy) composed of eight conservators (conservatori).

The Roman revolution of 1848 interrupted the reforming process that had begun with Rome the previous year, but in an edict of 24 November 1850, in implementation of Pius IX's motu prioprio of 12 September 1849, Cardinal Giacomo Antonelli defined the new competences of the council and magistracy. The councils would now:
nominate their own employees and those on their payroll
run the school system
maintain the roads and other communal infrastructure (bridges, aqueducts, fountains, etc.)
operate the public utilities
approve the annual tabella (budget)

The magistracy would now:
execute the decisions of the council
sign contracts on behalf of the council
prepare the annual budget and accounting statements

The municipalities were divided into five classes based on population, which determined how many councilors they would get:
> 20,000 inhabitants → first class → 36 councilors
> 10,000 inhabitants → second class → 30 councilors
> 5,000 inhabitants → third class → 24 councilors
> 1,000 inhabitants → fourth class → 16 councilors
< 1,000 inhabitants → fifth class → 10 councilors

The councilors were to be selected by the delegate and approved by the Cardinal Prefect of the Sacra Consulta.  Rome's council was reduced from 100 to 48.

Notes

References
Primary sources
Moto proprio della Santità di Nostro Signore Papa Pio Settimo in data de' 6 luglio 1816 sulla organizzazione dell'amministrazione pubblica esibito negli atti del nardi segretario di camera nel di 14 del mese ed anno suddetto

Secondary sources

Papal States
History of the papacy